The GCC U-19 Championship is an annual international football competition organised by the Gulf Cooperation Council. 2012 was expected to be the first edition of the tournament, set to be played in Qatar, however, the first edition was played in 2015 with the 2nd edition once again hosted by Qatar in 2016.

Records

References

External links
UAFA Official Website

Union of Arab Football Associations competitions
Under-19 association football competitions
Gulf Cooperation Council